Megetra cancellata is a species of blister beetle in the family Meloidae. It is found in Central America and North America.

Subspecies
These two subspecies belong to the species Megetra cancellata:
 Megetra cancellata cancellata
 Megetra cancellata hoegei Duges, 1889

References

Further reading

 
 

Meloidae
Articles created by Qbugbot
Beetles described in 1832